This is a list of museums in Namibia. The umbrella organisation for all Namibian museums is the Museums Association of Namibia (MAN).

List 
 Alte Feste
 Duwisib Castle Museum
 Geological Survey Museum
 Keetmanshoop Museum
 Independence Memorial Museum
 National Museum of Namibia
 Okahandja Military Museum
 Ombalantu baobab tree
 Outjo Museum
 Swakopmund Museum, founded in 1951 and privately administered by the Scientific Society Swakopmund 
 Trans-Namib Railroad Museum
 Tsumeb Museum

See also 
 List of museums

External links 
 Museums in Namibia
 Cultural Heritage - Swakopmund Museum

References

 
Namibia
Museums
Museums
Museums
Namibia